Marlen Reusser (born 20 September 1991) is a Swiss racing cyclist, who currently rides for UCI Women's WorldTeam .

Career
She took up competitive cycling whilst at university, riding in the cycling legs of mixed relay triathlons as an amateur. She entered the road events of the Swiss national cycling championships in 2017, a few months after receiving a racing licence and whilst in the final year of studies for a degree in medicine: she won the time trial and was runner up in the road race. Her success earned her selection for that year's European Road Championships. She also rode in the women's time trial event at the 2017 UCI Road World Championships. In 2019 Reusser took up a place at the World Cycling Centre in Aigle, deciding to ride full-time. During her year with the WCC she finished third at the BeNe Ladies Tour and sixth in the World Championship individual time trial.

The following year she took a top 10 finish at Liège–Bastogne–Liège. She also rode in the individual time trial at the 2020 UCI Road World Championships in Imola, where she won the silver medal.

After one season there, she joined  in 2022. She won stage 4 of the 2022 Tour de France in a solo breakaway. She was also named most combative rider for the day.

Personal life 
Marleen Reusser grew up in a farming family in the Swiss Emmental. Until 16 she played violin, and participated at an arts support program at the University of the Arts Bern. In school she started running, after a couple of ankle injuries she switched to swimming and cycling. 2008–2009 she was president of the Bernese Young Greens. After matura she studied medicine and worked as assistant doctor for surgery. 2017–2018 she was in the board of the Emmental Green Party. During the preparation for the road world championship 2018 in Innsbruck, she worked part time as a doctor in the Langnau hospital.

Major results

2017
 National Road Championships
1st  Time trial
2nd Road race
2019
 1st  Time trial, National Road Championships
 1st  Time trial, European Games
 1st Ljubljana–Domžale–Ljubljana TT
 3rd BeNe Ladies Tour
 4th SwissEver GP Cham–Hagendorn
 5th Overall The Princess Maha Chackri Sirindhorn's Cup
 6th Time trial, UCI Road World Championships
2020
 1st  Time trial, National Road Championships
 2nd  Time trial, UCI Road World Championships
 UEC European Road Championships
2nd  Team relay
3rd  Time trial
2021
UEC European Road Championships
1st  Time trial
7th Road race
 National Road Championships
1st  Time trial
1st  Road race
 1st Stage 2 (ITT) Holland Ladies Tour
 1st Chrono des Nations
 2nd Overall Challenge by La Vuelta
1st Stage 1
 2nd  Time trial, Olympic Games
 2nd  Time trial, UCI Road World Championships
 4th Overall Ladies Tour of Norway
 9th Tour of Flanders
2022
 UCI Road World Championships
1st  Team relay
3rd  Time trial
 1st Stage 4 Tour de France
 3rd Overall Bloeizone Fryslân Tour
 4th Brabantse Pijl
 5th Tour of Flanders

References

External links

 

1991 births
Living people
Swiss female cyclists
Sportspeople from the canton of Bern
Cyclists at the 2019 European Games
European Games medalists in cycling
European Games gold medalists for Switzerland
Olympic cyclists of Switzerland
Cyclists at the 2020 Summer Olympics
Medalists at the 2020 Summer Olympics
Olympic silver medalists for Switzerland
Olympic medalists in cycling
UCI Road World Champions (women)
20th-century Swiss women
21st-century Swiss women